Yvette is a 1928 French silent drama film directed by Alberto Cavalcanti and starring Catherine Hessling, Ica von Lenkeffy and Thomy Bourdelle.

The film's sets were designed by the art director Erik Aaes.

Cast
 Catherine Hessling as Yvette Obardi
 Ica von Lenkeffy as Comtesse Obardi
 Thomy Bourdelle as Kravalov
 Walter Byron as Jean de Servigny (as Walter Butler)
 Blanche Bernis as Dolores
 Nina Chousvalowa as Princess Kortchagin
 Clifford McLaglen as Saval
 Jean Storm as Valreali
 Pauline Carton as Pauline
 Simone Narbelle as Sylvie
 Jean-François Martial as Pascal
 Michel Duran as Louis
 Jean Marconi

See also
Yvette (1938)

References

Bibliography
 Abel, Richard. French Film Theory and Criticism: A History/anthology, 1907-1939, Volume 2. Princeton University Press, 1993.

External links

1928 films
Films directed by Alberto Cavalcanti
French silent films
French black-and-white films
French drama films
1928 drama films
Films based on short fiction
Films based on works by Guy de Maupassant
Silent drama films
1920s French films